Leonard "Reid" Hurley (born March 15, 1944) is a former Canadian politician. He served in the Legislative Assembly of New Brunswick from 1987 to 1995, as a Liberal member for the constituency of Charlotte West. He is a teacher.

References

New Brunswick Liberal Association MLAs
1944 births
Living people